Stuart Wilson (born 18 July 1977) is a Scottish amateur golfer.

Wilson won the 2004 Amateur Championship at St Andrews Links. His win gave him an entry to the 2004 Open Championship where he was the only Amateur to make the cut, and so winning the Silver Medal as the leading Amateur.

Wilson was the European Junior Ryder Cup captain in 2012 and 2014 and was the captain of the 2021 Walker Cup team.

Wilson was the managing secretary at Forfar Golf Club for 15 years before taking up a similar position at The Blairgowrie Golf Club in January 2021.

Amateur wins
2003 Lytham Trophy
2004 The Amateur Championship

Results in major championships

Note: Wilson never played in the U.S. Open or the PGA Championship.

LA = Low amateur
CUT = missed the half-way cut
"T" = tied

Team appearances
Palmer Cup (representing Great Britain & Ireland): 2001, 2002
European Amateur Team Championship (representing Scotland): 2003
Walker Cup (representing Great Britain & Ireland): 2003 (winners), 2021 (non-playing captain)
Eisenhower Trophy (representing Scotland): 2004
St Andrews Trophy (representing Great Britain & Ireland): 2004 (winners)
Bonallack Trophy (representing Europe): 2002, 2004

References

External links

Scottish male golfers
Amateur golfers
1977 births
Living people